Antennaria parvifolia is a species of flowering plant in the family Asteraceae, known by the common names Nuttall's pussytoes and small-leaf pussytoes (not to be confused with littleleaf pussytoes). It is native to western and central North America.

Description
Antennaria parvifolia generally grows a few centimeters high but it may reach . The plant may be gynoecious, containing only female flowers, or dioecious, with some female plants and some male in a given population. Dioecious plants are most common in Colorado and New Mexico, and can reproduce sexually, though male plants are much less common than female. Plants in most other areas are mostly gynoecious, reproducing asexually via apomixis. The plant forms mats by spreading stolons and sprouting new stems. The flower heads are lined with an outer layer of phyllaries which are translucent except at the base, where they vary from white, red, green, and brown. The fruit is an achene with a pappus that helps it disperse on the wind.

Features that distinguish the species from other members of Antennaria include the clustered basal leaves and the near absence of dark bases on the backs of the flower bracts.

Distribution and habitat 
The species is native to western and central North America and widespread in Canada, the United States, and northern Mexico—from British Columbia east to Ontario and south to California, Chihuahua, and Nuevo León. It has not been observed in California since 1987.

It can be found in open and dry areas such as plains and openings in forests.

Ecology 
In Colorado, the species is an indicator of overgrazing and increases in frequency on heavily grazed land. It grows in disturbed habitat and a wide variety of ecosystems and soil types.

References

External links
 
 

parvifolia
Plants described in 1841
Flora of North America
Flora of Canada
Flora of Eastern Canada
Flora of Ontario
Flora of Western Canada
Flora of Alberta
Flora of British Columbia
Flora of Manitoba
Flora of Saskatchewan
Flora of the United States
Flora of the North-Central United States
Flora of Kansas
Flora of Nebraska
Flora of Minnesota
Flora of North Dakota
Flora of Oklahoma
Flora of South Dakota
Flora of the Northeastern United States
Flora of Michigan
Flora of the Northwestern United States
Flora of Colorado
Flora of Idaho
Flora of Montana
Flora of Oregon
Flora of Washington (state)
Flora of Wyoming
Flora of the Southwestern United States
Flora of Arizona
Flora of California
Flora of Nevada
Flora of Utah
Flora of the South-Central United States
Flora of New Mexico
Flora of Texas